Tai Po Market is an MTR station on the  in the New Territories, Hong Kong. Located between Flagstaff Hill and Wan Tau Tong Estate in Tai Po, and adjacent to the eponymous market town, the station has three tracks and four platforms. Platform 1 is for northbound trains to border crossing stations at Lo Wu and Lok Ma Chau and platform 4 is for southbound trains to Hung Hom, Kowloon while platforms 2 and 3 use the same track and is reserved for peak hour traffic.

History

Between 1913 and 1982, the old Tai Po Market station located within the Tai Po Market proper served the passengers of Tai Po. The old station is a 10-minute walk from the current one. During the electrification of the Kowloon–Canton Railway (British Section) (now known as the East Rail line), the station was relocated to the current location on 7 April 1983, while the old station building became a part of the Hong Kong Railway Museum. On 2 May the same year, the KCR was electrified to Tai Po Market; full line was electrified on 15 July 1983.

The station went under a major renovation which was completed in 2009. During the renovation, it remained open though most of the retail outlets were closed.

Station layout 

The station consists of two island platforms, with platforms 2 and 3 sharing the same centre track. This centre track serves as the terminus of some trains during the day, and the departure of some extra trains southbound during morning peak hours. Northbound trains that arrive here after 11 p.m. use the centre track instead, as Platform 1 is reserved for late night trains that terminate at Tai Po Market instead of continuing towards Lo Wu or Lok Ma Chau.

Exits 
 A: Uptown Plaza
 A1: Uptown Plaza
 A2: Tat Wan Road, Wan Tau Kok
 A3: Public transport interchange (Nga Wan Road)
 B: Kwong Fuk Estate

Transport interchange 
Bus and public light bus services are available for the few housing estates of Tai Po; bus services include MTR Bus (formerly KCR Feeder Bus) and Kowloon Motor Bus (KMB) services. Several routes of MTR Bus, such as route K14, which connects private housing estate , and the station, were introduced in 1980s. The bus terminus of the station also had routes that connected to other new towns of Hong Kong, such as KMB's route 64K that connects Tai Po and Yuen Long.

Gallery

References

External links

MTR stations in the New Territories
East Rail line
Tai Po
Railway stations in Hong Kong opened in 1983